Aberdeen is a small town in the Sarah Baartman District Municipality of the Eastern Cape province of South Africa. With its numerous examples of Victorian architecture, it is one of the architectural conservation areas of the Karoo.

The town is some 55 km south-west of Graaff-Reinet, 155 km east-south-east of Beaufort West and 32 km south of the Camdeboo Mountains. Laid out on the farm Brakkefontein as a settlement of the Dutch Reformed Church in 1856, it became a municipality in 1858. It is named after Aberdeen in Scotland, birthplace of the Reverend Andrew Murray of Graaff-Reinet, relieving minister.

The Aberdeen Provincial Hospital is situated in Aberdeen.

Schools in Aberdeen

Aberdeen Senior Secondary School

Luxolo intermediate School

Camdeboo Primary

Aberdeen Primary School

Notable people from Aberdeen
Conan Doyle (1917–1942), cricketer
Anaso Jobodwana

References

External links
 Eastern Cape Tourism Board
 

Populated places in the Dr Beyers Naudé Local Municipality
Populated places established in 1856